Myioparus is a genus of passerine birds in the Old World flycatcher family Muscicapidae.
 
It contains the following species:
 Grey-throated tit-flycatcher (Myioparus griseigularis)
 Grey tit-flycatcher (Myioparus plumbeus)

References

 Del Hoyo, J.; Elliot, A. & Christie D. (editors). (2006). Handbook of the Birds of the World. Volume 11: Old World Flycatchers to Old World Warblers. Lynx Edicions. .

 
Taxonomy articles created by Polbot